Henry William Weber (1783–1818) was an English editor of plays and romances and literary assistant of Sir Walter Scott.

Life
Weber was born in 1783, allegedly in St. Petersburg, and is said to have been the son of a Westphalian who married an Englishwoman. He was sent with his mother to Edinburgh "by some of the London booksellers in a half-starved state." Sir Walter Scott employed him from August 1804 as his amanuensis, and secured for him profitable work in literature. Weber was described as affectionate, but imbued with Jacobin principles by Scott. (Scott, Journal, 1890, i. 149). After Christmas 1813 a fit of madness seized Weber at dusk, at the close of a day's work in the same room with his employer. He produced a pair of pistols, and challenged Scott to mortal combat. A parley ensued, and Weber dined with the Scotts; next day he was put under restraint. His friends, with some assistance from Scott, supported him, "a hopeless lunatic," in an asylum at York. There he died in June 1818.

Works
Weber edited multiple works, most notably:

The Battle of Flodden Field: a Poem of the Sixteenth Century, with various Readings, Notes, &c., 1808; Newcastle, 1819. Sixteen copies of the Notes and Illustrations were struck off separately. Scott advised him in the publication and supplied materials. 
 Metrical Romances of the Thirteenth, Fourteenth, and Sixteenth Centuries, with Introduction, Notes, and Glossary, 1810, 3 vols. Described by Southey as 'admirably edited' (Letters, ed. Warter, ii. 308). 
 Dramatic Works of John Ford, with Introduction and Explanatory Notes, 1811, 2 vols. He was not skilled in old English literature, and did not collate the early editions of the plays. This work aroused a storm of angry comment. 
 Works of Beaumont and Fletcher, with Introduction and Explanatory Notes, 1812, 14 vols.; Scott's annotated edition supplied many of the notes.
Tales of the East; comprising the most Popular Romances of Oriental Origin and the best Imitations by European Authors, 1812, 3 vols.; the preface was borrowed from the Tartarian Tales of Thomas Flloyd of Dublin (Athenæum, 14 April 1894, p. 474). 
 Popular Romances, consisting of Imaginary Voyages and Travels, 1812 (Lowndes, Bibl. Man. ed. Bohn, iv. 2862). 
 Genealogical History of Earldom of Sutherland, by Sir Robert Gordon [edited by Weber], 1813. 
 Illustrations of Northern Antiquities from the earlier Teutonic and Scandinavian Romances, 1814; in this Weber was assisted by Dr. Jamieson and Scott.

References

Attribution

1783 births
1818 deaths
English editors
Amanuenses